Doomtrooper, also known as Doom Trooper, is an out-of-print collectible card game designed by Bryan Winter and was released in January 1995. It was originally published by Target Games and Heartbreaker Hobbies. 
It is based on concepts from the Mutant Chronicles franchise. Players use warriors to attack and gain either Promotion Points or Destiny Points. Promotion points can be used to win; Destiny Points are used to purchase more warriors and equipment. There are 13 different card types and over 1100 different cards available.

The game was later migrated to a digital version that was successfully funded on Kickstarter.

Expansions
Basic Set in limited, unlimited and revised unlimited editions
Inquisition
Warzone
Mortificator
Golgotha
Apocalypse
Paradise Lost

The 170-card expansion set Inquisition was released in April 1995 and sold in 8-card booster packs. Some of the cards were printed with foil stamping. The expansion set Paradise Lost consisted of over 100 cards sold in 15-card booster packs.

The limited edition of the basic set was released in English, Italian, Spanish, and Swedish. The unlimited edition, published in April 1995, was published in an additional nine languages, including Hebrew and Japanese.

Reviews
Pyramid #13 (May/June, 1995)
Review in Shadis

Footnotes

References

Further reading

Preview in Scrye #9

External links
Official Website
www.doomtrooper.pl - Polish Doom Trooper Center

International Doomtrooper Online Community
Playing Online with lackeyccg

Card games introduced in 1995
Collectible card games